Bété may refer to:
Bété people of Côte d'Ivoire
Bété language or languages spoken by them
Bété alphabet
Bété (fruit), a small citrus fruit grown in southern Nigeria. Closely related to the lime.